The Kappa Sigma Fraternity House is a historic fraternity house at the University of Illinois at Urbana–Champaign in Champaign, Illinois. The house was built in 1911 for the Alpha Gamma chapter of the Kappa Sigma fraternity; it was one of the university's first large fraternity houses. The fraternity was established in 1891; it was the first fraternity formed at the university after it lifted its prohibition on fraternities. Football coach Robert Lackey helped found the fraternity, and during its early years many of the university's best athletes were members. Architect Archie H. Hubbard, himself an early member of the fraternity, designed the house in the Italian Renaissance Revival style. The three-story brick building features a loggia on the two side facades and belt courses dividing the floors. The upper two stories of the building have distinctive diamond-patterned brickwork.

The building was added to the National Register of Historic Places on August 28, 1989.

References

Residential buildings on the National Register of Historic Places in Illinois
Renaissance Revival architecture in Illinois
Houses completed in 1911
National Register of Historic Places in Champaign County, Illinois
Buildings and structures of the University of Illinois Urbana-Champaign
Fraternity and sorority houses
Buildings and structures in Champaign, Illinois